Lukas Scherff (born 14 July 1996) is a German professional footballer who plays as a defender for Hansa Rostock.

References

1996 births
Living people
Sportspeople from Schwerin
German footballers
Association football defenders
FC Hansa Rostock players
3. Liga players
Regionalliga players
Footballers from Mecklenburg-Western Pomerania